The Virtual Global University (VGU) is a virtual university offering online distance education or virtual education on the Internet.

Organization

The Virtual Global University (VGU) is a private organization founded in 2001 by 17 professors of Business Informatics from 14 different universities in Germany, Austria and Switzerland. The VGU brings together the knowledge and experience of people from different universities in one virtual organization. At the same time it is a real organization, according to German civil law under the name "VGU Private Virtual Global University GmbH".

Within the Virtual Global University, the School of Business Informatics (SBI) is the organizational unit that offers online courses and an online study program.

Studies

The focus of VGU's study offerings is information technology (IT) and management—or Business Informatics as it is called in Central Europe. Students of Business Informatics (BI) are taught how to use IT effectively to develop business solutions for global challenges.

All courses offered by the VGU are based on the Internet as well as on commonly available information and communication technology and are given entirely, or are substantially supported, by means of electronic media. The MBI can be conducted either in English or in German.

MBI program

The VGU offers a master's program leading to the degree of an "International Master of Business Informatics" (MBI). The creation of the MBI was supported by the German "Bundesministerium für Bildung und Forschung" (federal ministry of education and research) within the program "New Media in Education". The program is accredited by government as well as by ACQUIN. The master's degree is awarded by the European University Viadrina (EUV) in Frankfurt (Oder), Germany in cooperation with the VGU. While the latter one provides expertise and teaching for the program, EUV is responsible for ensuring that the academic and educational standards of the program are maintained at an appropriate level.

Certificate courses

Independent certificate courses on a number of IT and management topics are offered in addition to the master program MBI.

Faculty and management

Head

The head of the Virtual Global University is Prof. Dr. Karl Kurbel. He is also CEO of the VGU GmbH and head of the Business Informatics Chair at the European University Viadrina in Frankfurt (Oder), Germany.

Faculty

The faculty of the School Business Informatics consists of 18 professors plus external lecturers, assisted by teaching assistants. The current faculty members are:

Prof. Dr. Freimut Bodendorf, Chair of Information Systems II, Friedrich-Alexander-University, Erlangen-Nuremberg, Germany
 Prof. Dr. Stefan Eicker, Research Group for Business Informatics and Software Engineering, University of Duisburg-Essen, Essen, Germany
 Prof. Dr. Dimitris Karagiannis, Institute of Applied Computer Science and Information Systems - Knowledge Engineering, University of Vienna, Vienna, Austria
Prof. Dr. Gerhard Knolmayer, Institute of Information Systems - Research Group "Information Engineering", University of Berne, Berne, Switzerland
 Prof. Dr. Hermann Krallmann, Department of Computer Science - Systems Analysis, Technical University of Berlin, Berlin, Germany
 Prof. Dr. Karl Kurbel, Chair of Business Informatics, European University Viadrina, Frankfurt (Oder), Germany
Prof. Dr. Susanne Leist, Faculty of Business, Economics and Information Systems, University of Regensburg, Regensburg, Germany
 Prof. Dr. Gustaf Neumann, Chair of Information Systems and New Media, Vienna University of Economics and Business Administration, Vienna, Austria
 Prof. Dr. Andreas Oberweis, Institute of Applied Informatics and Formal Description Methods, University of Karlsruhe, Karlsruhe, Germany
 Prof. Dr. Guenther Pernul, Faculty of Business, Economics and Information Systems, University of Regensburg, Regensburg, Germany
 Prof. Dr. Claus Rautenstrauch, Department of Business Information Systems, Otto-von-Guericke University, Magdeburg, Germany
 Prof. Dr. Susanne Robra-Bissantz, Department of Business Informatics, Braunschweig University of Technology, Braunschweig, Germany
 Prof. Dr.-Ing. Hans Roeck, Chair of Business Informatics, University of Rostock, Rostock, Germany
 Prof. Dr. August-Wilhelm Scheer, Institute of Business Informatics, Saarland University, Saarbruecken, Germany
 Prof. Dr. Bernd Scholz-Reiter, Bremen Institute of Industrial Technology and Applied Work Science, University of Bremen, Bremen, Germany
 Prof. Dr. Wolffried Stucky, Institute of Applied Informatics and Formal Description Methods, University of Karlsruhe, Karlsruhe, Germany
 Prof. Dr. Alfred Taudes, Department of Production Management, Vienna University of Economics and Business Administration, Vienna, Austria
 Prof. Dr. Robert Winter, Institute of Information Management, University of St. Gallen, St. Gallen, Switzerland

References

External links
Virtual Global University
European University Viadrina

2001 establishments in Europe
Information technology organizations
Educational organizations based in Europe
Information technology education